Eutreta novaeboracensis is a species of tephritid or fruit flies in the genus Eutreta of the family Tephritidae.

Distribution
United States, Canada.

References

Tephritinae
Insects described in 1855
Diptera of North America